The Movement for Peace and Development for Angola(MPDA) is a political party in Angola. Massunguna da Silva Pedro is the president of the party. MPDA is a member of the coalition  United Patriotic Movement, of which Mr. Massunguna da Silva Pedro also member. The party was founded on July 4, 2004.

References

Political parties in Angola
Political parties established in 1994
1994 establishments in Angola